Fenglin railway station is a railway station located in Fenglin Township, Hualien County, Taiwan. It is located on the Taitung line and is operated by the Taiwan Railways Administration.

Around the station
 Lintian Police Substation and Old Lintian Police Station

References

1912 establishments in Taiwan
Railway stations in Hualien County
Railway stations opened in 1912
Railway stations served by Taiwan Railways Administration